Mississagi may refer to:
 Mississagi River—a river in Algoma and Sudbury Districts, Ontario, Canada
 Mississagi Strait—a narrow channel in Lake Huron
 Mississagi Provincial Park—a natural environment-class park north of Elliot Lake
 Mississagi Island—an island in the North Channel of Lake Huron
 Mississagi River Provincial Park—a protected area on the Mississagi River in Algoma and Sudbury Districts, Ontario, Canada . ...
Mississagi (ship, 1943), a self-unloading bulk carrier